The Atlantic Hockey Regular Season Goaltending Award is an annual award given out at the conclusion of the Atlantic Hockey regular season to the best goaltender in the conference as determined by in-conference goals against average.

Award winners

Winners by school

Multiple Awards

References

Goaltending Award
College ice hockey goaltender awards in the United States